Ismael "Mike" Dres Sueno (born July 1947 or 1948) is the former Secretary of the Philippine Department of the Interior and Local Government. He was appointed by President Rodrigo Duterte to replace Mel Senen Sarmiento starting June 30, 2016. A member and former national chairman of PDP–Laban, he served as Governor of South Cotabato under President Corazon Aquino. On April 4, 2017, Sueno was dismissed as Secretary of the Interior and Local Government by Duterte due to 'loss of trust and confidence'.

Early life and education 
Sueno was born and raised in Koronadal, then known as Marbel, in the former undivided Province of Cotabato. His parents were Perfecto Sueno Sr., the first municipal vice mayor of Koronadal, and Ma. Neri Dres. He has five brothers (Rolando, Perfecto Jr., Roberto, Leo and Joseph), and one sister (Corazon), some of which have already migrated to the United States. He obtained his associate degree in Arts from Our Lady of Perpetual Help Seminary in Marbel in 1964. He then pursued his Bachelor of Arts degree in Philosophy from the Regional Major Seminary.

Political career  
Sueno was elected municipal mayor of Koronadal in 1980 during the administration of President Ferdinand Marcos. In 1986, following the People Power Revolution, he was appointed by President Corazon Aquino as officer-in-charge (OIC) governor of the province of South Cotabato. He then served a full term as provincial governor from 1988 to 1992. During his term as governor, he pursued several environmental and reforestation programs integrated with livelihood projects. He imposed a total logging ban in the province and also helped organize and strengthen local cooperatives.

In 1997, Sueno was appointed to the Southern Philippine Council for Peace and Development (SPCPD) Consultative Assembly by President Fidel Ramos. He was an unsuccessful candidate for vice president and running mate to Emilio Osmeña on the Probinsya Muna Development Initiative (PROMDI) ticket in the 1998 presidential election.

Sueno ran for congressman of South Cotabato's 2nd District in 2001 but lost to Arthur Y. Pingoy, Jr. In 2007, he made another unsuccessful bid for Vice Governor of the province under the administration party.

He was appointed Secretary of the Interior and Local Government by President Rodrigo Duterte on June 30, 2016. On April 4, 2017, he was reported by Justice Secretary Vitaliano Aguirre as having been fired from his office by the president due to corruption allegations.

References 

|-

|-

Living people
Secretaries of the Interior and Local Government of the Philippines
Governors of South Cotabato
Mayors of places in South Cotabato
Candidates in the 1998 Philippine vice-presidential election
PDP–Laban politicians
Probinsya Muna Development Initiative politicians
People from South Cotabato
Ramos administration personnel
Duterte administration cabinet members
Year of birth uncertain
Corazon Aquino administration personnel
Political corruption in the Philippines
Suspected criminals
1940s births